Mamsko-Chuysky District is an administrative district, one of the thirty-three in Irkutsk Oblast, Russia. Municipally, it is incorporated as Mamsko-Chuysky Municipal District. Its administrative center is the urban locality (a work settlement) of Mama. Population:  7,990 (2002 Census);  The population of Mama accounts for 66.0% of the district's total population.

Geography
The district borders the Sakha Republic and the Lena River in the north. It includes parts of the basins of the Vitim, Mama and Chuya rivers, as well as several of their tributaries.

References

Notes

Sources

Districts of Irkutsk Oblast